The Grand Naniloa Hotel is a hotel in Hilo, Hawaii, on the eastern side of the Big Island. It is the largest hotel in the state of Hawaii's second largest city, and has the longest history as a hotel on Hawaii Island.

History

The Grand Naniloa Hotel opened in 1939, on Waiakea Peninsula, a small peninsula that protrudes into Hilo Bay. It is located on Banyan Drive which was developed in the early 1930s and which is lined with large Hawaiian banyan trees. Liliuokalani Park and Gardens are within a walking distance.

In 1946, Hilo was devastated by the tsunami associated with the 1946 Aleutian Islands earthquake and others, but the town and hotel recovered.

The hotel currently consists of three towers, named after the Big Island's volcanos: Mauna Kea, Mauna Loa, and Kilauea.

The management and ownership of the hotel have changed several times. It was originally owned by a local company. In 2013, Aqua-Aston Hotels and Resorts of Honolulu started its management, while Tower Development became the owner.

In 2016, the Hilton Hotels & Resorts completed a three-year renovation of the hotel, and it now operates as a Hilton DoubleTree hotel. It was a $30 million renovation.

Hula
The hotel has an association with hula dancing.  It is a host of Hilo's annual Merrie Monarch Festival, which began in 1963, and is now a week-long event with three days of hula competition.  The Hula Halau Ke 'Olu Makani 'O Mauna Loa, a hālau hula, regularly practices on the hotel's grounds.

Frommer's summarizes that the hotel "has declared itself 'the home of hula.' Renowned photographer Kim Taylor Reese’s images of hula dancers hang on virtually every wall, high-definition video of the Merrie Monarch hula competition plays in the new, open-air lobby, with a central bar. Hula Hulas poolside restaurant offers locally sourced dishes, live music, and hula."

Other
The hotel has a nine-hole golf course, the only one in Hilo.  The hotel has a small swimming pool and stands directly on Hilo Bay, but the guests have to drive one or two miles from Banyan Drive to Kalanianaole Avenue to find sand beaches.

Like other businesses on the bay, the Grand Naniloa Hotel does not own the land on which the hotel is situated, nor its golf course, but rather leases from the Hawai'i Department of Land and Natural Resources.
The lease was assumed in the 2013 purchase of the property when the lease had 58 years remaining and required payments of $500,000 per year.

See also
Hilo Hawaiian Hotel
Volcano House

References

External links
Official site
Official site (Hilton)

Hilton Hotels & Resorts hotels
Hilo, Hawaii
Hotels in Hawaii (island)
1939 establishments in Hawaii
Hotels established in 1939